Gabriel Gruber, S.J. (May 6, 1740 – April 7, 1805) was the second Superior General of the Society of Jesus in Russia.

Early years and education
Gabriel Gruber, born in Vienna, became a Jesuit at the young age of 15, in 1755 and did most of his formation and studies in Austria: Latin and Greek in Leoben (1757–1758), theology, philosophy and mathematics in Graz (1758–60), languages in Vienna (1760–61), mathematics in Trnava, Hungary (1761–62), and again theology in Vienna (1763–67). In 1766, he was ordained priest in Graz.

The engineer
Gruber was an expert in hydrotechnology and architecture, and had also a basic knowledge of navigation and the history of seamanship.
In early life, Gruber was a fanatical builder of model ships, and some of the teaching materials at the School of Mechanical Engineering were naval models of his that were made at the school between 1774 and 1783. Before being included in the Maritime Museum of Piran collection, these models were kept in the National Museum in Ljubljana. Some of Gruber's other workshop models had been in Pula, Croatia, but disappeared during the withdrawal of the Italian Army in 1943. Other Gruber models exhibited in the Maritime Museum are the Venetian battle galleon, the lagoon cargo galleon, the corvette, the schooner and a framework used during ship construction.

In 1768, he moved to Ljubljana, where he since 1769 taught mathematics, mechanics, hydraulics and engineering at the School of Mechanical Engineering in Ljubljana (German: Laibach). The school taught classes in shipbuilding, port devices and structures, and Gruber's wish was to build a dockyard nearby. That enterprise proved to be prohibitively expensive. From 1772 until 1781 Gruber was the director of the navigation direction in Ljubljana, which took custody of the improvement of navigation on the Sava, the Kolpa and the Ljubljanica. After the Suppression of the Society of Jesus by Pope Clement XIV, in 1773, Gruber remained as engineer at the court of Emperor Joseph II until 1784.

From 1772 until 1780, the construction of the Gruber Canal was started upon his plans, to improve the outflow of water from the Ljubljana Marsh and thus to protect the town of Ljubljana from flooding. The works were carried out under his supervision until 1777, when he was replaced by Vincenc Struppi, due to large increases of the expenses and even doubts about his integrity. At the same time, he was the architect and builder of Gruber Palace — a vast rococo edifice that was originally his mansion — used for his research in physics and hydraulics. It had also an astronomic observatory. The palace was bought in 1887 by the Carniolan Savings Bank and has housed the Slovenian archives since 1965.

Return to the Jesuits
In 1785, Gruber went to Polotsk, a border city between the Polish–Lithuanian Commonwealth and the Russian Empire to rejoin the Society of Jesus and became a member of the Jesuit community in Russia. Gruber was an active engineer, chemist, architect, painter, mechanic and physician. Under his influence, the Jesuit College in Polatsk became a famous academy of technical science. He was influential in the court of Catherine the Great, and was close to her successor Tsar Paul I, at whose request he reorganized the technical training in the whole Russian empire. In 1800 Gruber became the first rector of the Aristocratic College at the Saint Petersburg State University.

Superior General
Living at Saint Petersburg, and being a close confidant of Paul I, Gruber often discussed with him the affairs of the Society, on behalf of Franciszek Kareu, Vicar General of the Jesuits in Russia. In 1797 he became officially the Assistant of Kareu and ultimately, after the death of the later, Gruber was elected Superior General of the Society of Jesus in Russia, at the Regional (Polotsk) Congregation IV (1802). That was just a few months after Pius VII had issued the brief Catholicae fidei (1801), giving approval to the existence of the Russian Jesuits and making the Temporary Vicar (Franciszek Kareu) 'Superior General for Russia'. Gruber expanded pioneering activities by opening several missions among the Germans in the Volga region (Saratov, 1803), Odessa (1804) and Astrakhan (1805) where schools and agricultural activities were developed. However, politically, problems were growing with Paul I as well as with the local bishop of Polatsk.

Towards reunification
In the meantime the movement towards reunion of the Jesuits was gaining momentum. In the wake of the French revolution political opposition of the Bourbon courts had weakened. In 1803 the Jesuits of Stonyhurst College in England were made members of the Russian Jesuit province. The 'Fathers of the Faith' an independent group of ex-jesuits received affiliation in 1805. Contacts were established with the ex-Jesuits of Maryland (USA). In 1804, the existence of the Jesuits was officially recognized in Naples and Gruber became 'Superior General of the Society of Jesus in Russia and Naples'. Plans were on to send an overland mission to China when Gruber died after an accidental fire at his Saint Petersburg residence on April 7, 1805.

See also
 Jurij Vega

References
Inglot, M., La Compagnia di Gesù nel Impero Russo (1772-1820), Rome, 1997.
Pierling, P., G. Gruber et les jésuites réfugiés en Russie, Meudon, 1999.

External links

1740 births
1805 deaths
18th-century Austrian Jesuits
Superiors General of the Society of Jesus
Carniolan astronomers
19th-century Austrian Jesuits
Carniolan Jesuits
Carniolan engineers